Court TV is an American digital broadcast network and former cable television channel. It was originally launched in 1991 with a focus on crime-themed programs such as the true crime documentary series, legal analysis talk shows, and live news coverage of prominent criminal cases. In 2008, the original cable channel became TruTV. 
The channel relaunched on May 8, 2019 as a digital broadcast television network owned by Katz Broadcasting, a subsidiary of the E. W. Scripps Company. Court TV is also available via streaming services such as YouTube TV and Pluto TV, and its audio feed is available on Sirius XM channel 793.

History

As a cable television channel
Cable television channel Courtroom Television Network, known as Court TV, was launched on July 1, 1991, at 6:00 am Eastern Time by founder Steven Brill and was available to three million subscribers. Its original anchors were Jack Ford, Fred Graham, Cynthia McFadden, and Gregg Jarrett. The network was born out of two competing projects to launch cable channels with live courtroom proceedings, the American Trial Network from Time Warner and American Lawyer Media, and In Court from Cablevision and NBC. Both projects were present at the National Cable Television Association, in June 1990. Rather than trying to establish two competing networks, the projects were combined on December 14, 1990. Liberty Media would join the venture in 1991. The network's first logo consisted of a rectangle with the word "COURT", and the letters "TV" below, with a line underneath. The network's second logo ran from 1999 to 2005. The network's third and final logo ran from 2005 to 2007.

The channel originally consisted of live courtroom trials that were interspersed with anchors and reporters. It was led by law writer Steven Brill, who later left the network in 1997. The network came into its own during the Menendez brothers' first trial in 1994, and the O.J. Simpson murder trial in 1995. In 1998, NBC sold its share of the network to Time Warner. That same year, Court TV began running several original and acquired programs in prime time, such as Homicide: Life on the Street, and Forensic Files. In 1999, it acquired the rerun rights to Fox's Cops.

Recognizing the growth of its prime time programming, Court TV announced in 2005 that it would split its programming into two brands. Daytime trial coverage was branded as Court TV News while other dayparts were branded under the tagline Seriously Entertaining; this programming would feature new reality television series focusing on crime-oriented topics. In January 2006, the network launched a male-targeted programming block known as "RED", an abbreviation of "Real. Exciting. Dramatic."

Time Warner bought full control of Court TV in 2006 and began running it as part of the company's Turner Broadcasting System division. The buyout of Court TV marked Time Warner's first television network acquisition, rather than a sale, since the acquisition of Turner in 1996. On July 11, 2007, it was announced that Court TV would be relaunched as truTV on January 1, 2008. The new brand was intended to accompany a larger shift towards action-oriented reality series which did not necessarily involve crime or law enforcement.

Reruns of Court TV series then aired on HLN (primarily Forensic Files) and the over-the-air digital network True Crime Network (originally known as Justice Network). With changes to HLN's programming strategy and the growing popularity of the genre, the network began to produce and premiere more original true crime programs in 2017.

As a digital broadcast network
On December 10, 2018, Katz Broadcasting (owned by the E. W. Scripps Company) announced that it would relaunch Court TV as an over-the-air network following the acquisition of the intellectual property rights to the Court TV name and the pre-2008 Court TV original programming library from Turner Broadcasting System and Warner Bros. Television Studios. Scripps announced affiliation deals with Tribune Media and Univision Communications at that date, in addition to existing Scripps-owned stations. Further deals with Meredith Corporation, Nexstar Media Group (which was in the process of acquiring Tribune; the deal closed in September 2019), Tegna, and Quincy Media were announced on May 2, 2019. The channel is also available nationally on Pluto TV.

The relaunched Court TV features live court coverage with former Court TV anchor Vinnie Politan as lead anchor and Court TV and CNN producers John Alleva and Scott Tufts as vice presidents and managing editors. The network began broadcasting on May 8, 2019. The first live courtroom coverage was the Covington, Georgia, trial of parents who, after reporting their newborn baby missing in 2017, were later charged with murder. It also featured coverage of the Harvey Weinstein sexual assault trial and the trial of Kyle Rittenhouse.

In May 2020, the network was picked up for carriage on YouTube TV.

Following Scripps acquisition of Ion Media in 2021, it began to add Court TV to its stations in place of the defunct Qubo, Ion Plus and Ion Shop networks.

Affiliates

Programming
Court TV currently shows gavel to gavel live news trial coverage under the branding Court TV Live. Ted Rowlands anchors from 9am to noon, Julie Grant from noon til 3pm, Ashley Willcott takes over from 3pm-6pm, and Michael Ayala is on from 6pm until 8pm. Vinnie Politan anchors Closing Arguments with Vinnie Politan from 8pm-11pm and is repeated twice in a row from 11pm to 5am.

Court TV's original programming traditionally consisted of reality legal programming and legal drama, such as legal-based news shows, legal-based talk shows, live homicide trial coverage, court shows, police force shows, and other criminal justice programming. The channel also carried a week-daily news block, In Session (the successor to Court TV News), which provided live news coverage of trials, legal news and details of highly publicized crimes Monday through Fridays from 9 to 11 a.m. ET (except during national holidays, with reruns of the channel's reality programming airing in place of the block on such days). Its coverage included analysis from anchors and guests to help viewers understand legal proceedings. In Session also ran a blog, Sidebar, where the In Session team posted updated legal news and analysis.

On August 11, 2020, it was announced that a new original true-crime series titled Judgment with Ashleigh Banfield will premiere on September 13, 2020.

Other media

UK and Ireland

On 10 August 2020, Court TV began testing on Astra 28.2°E on frequency 11568 V DVB-S QPSK 22 5/6, with the label "54140".

On 1 September 2020, Court TV was added to the EPG on Sky on channel 179 ahead of its official launch on 8 September 2020 as a replacement of Sony Crime Channel, according to on-screen information.

On 15 February 2021, Court TV joined the Freeview television service in the UK with a short-term deal in order to show the trial of Derek Chauvin. It was found on channel 89 and joined the Law & Crime Trial Network as part of the service's offerings (though this other network is currently found as part of the streaming options on channel 271, as it is broadcast via Channelbox). On June 1, 2021 Court TV shut down on Freeview, less than four months after starting, with its channel number de-activated on June 22.

Satellite radio channel
Court TV relaunched its satellite radio channel on May 15, 2020 on SiriusXM. It was removed on April 21, 2022.

Former spin-offs

Canadian version

Court TV Canada, a Canadian version of the channel under its previous format, owned by CHUM Limited (and later acquired by CTVglobemedia which then sold its assets to Bell Canada under the Bell Media subsidiary), launched on September 7, 2001. Unlike its U.S. counterpart, it did not re-brand under the TruTV name and continued to operate as Court TV until August 30, 2010, when, as part of a wider licensing agreement with Discovery Communications and CTV, Court TV was replaced by Investigation Discovery (Canada).

The U.S. version of Court TV had earlier been approved by the Canadian Radio-television and Telecommunications Commission as an eligible foreign channel in 1997, and indeed, had been carried by several Canadian service providers prior to the launch of the domestic service.

Websites
In 2001, Court TV purchased The Smoking Gun, a website that focuses on legal items such as mug shots and other public documents pertaining to famous individuals and cases. The site remained a property of the company through the rebranding to TruTV, but was sold back to its founder in 2014.

Court TV purchased the website Crime Library, which provided detailed information about infamous crimes and how they were solved, in 2001. The website remained an actively updated property until 2014 and was taken offline in 2015.

Sirius Radio channel 
On February 3, 2003, Court TV Plus debuted on Sirius Satellite Radio, featuring audio from Court TV programs. Launched on Channel 134, it was moved in September 2005 and aired on Channel 110 until the channel ceased operations on January 1, 2008.

Court TV Mystery

On September 30, 2019, the Escape network was rebranded as Court TV Mystery, serving as an extension to the Court TV brand. The network was subsequently rebranded to Ion Mystery on February 24, 2022, with the "Ion" brand now more established regarding procedural dramas in general, including Ion Mystery's overall programming, whereas Court TV is more associated with its news division.

References

External links

 
Court TV Live Stream

E. W. Scripps Company
Former General Electric subsidiaries
Former Time Warner subsidiaries
Former Liberty Media subsidiaries
Television networks in the United States
Television channels and stations established in 1991
Television channels and stations disestablished in 2008
Television channels and stations established in 2019
1991 establishments in the United States
2008 disestablishments in the United States
2019 establishments in the United States
Re-established companies